Susan Barnard (born 18 January 1961) is a British former swimmer. She competed in two events at the 1976 Summer Olympics. The 1976 British Olympic team for the Women's 200 m freestyle - Swimming event included Susan Edmondson, Ann Bradshaw and Barnard.

She also won the 1975 ASA National Championship 100 metres freestyle title and the 200 metres freestyle.

References

External links
 

1961 births
Living people
British female swimmers
Olympic swimmers of Great Britain
Swimmers at the 1976 Summer Olympics
Place of birth missing (living people)
20th-century British women